Wanderson Cavalcante Melo (born 26 July 1994), known as Wanderson Maranhão, is a Brazilian professional footballer who plays for Chornomorets Odesa.

References

External links 
 
 Player's profile at pressball.by

1994 births
Living people
Brazilian footballers
Association football midfielders
Brazilian expatriate footballers
Expatriate footballers in Sweden
Brazilian expatriate sportspeople in Sweden
Expatriate footballers in Belarus
Brazilian expatriate sportspeople in Belarus
Expatriate footballers in Ukraine
Brazilian expatriate sportspeople in Ukraine
Expatriate footballers in Lithuania
Brazilian expatriate sportspeople in Lithuania
A Lyga players
Coritiba Foot Ball Club players
Foz do Iguaçu Futebol Clube players
Maringá Futebol Clube players
Esporte Clube XV de Novembro (Piracicaba) players
AFC Eskilstuna players
FC Vitebsk players
FC Chornomorets Odesa players
FK Panevėžys players